Birur is a town located in Kadur Taluk in Chikkamagaluru district in the state of Karnataka, India.
It belongs to Mysuru Division. It is located 41 km  East from District headquarters Chikkamagaluru.

It has an average elevation of 833 metres (2732 feet). It is also called the Gateway of Malnad region.
As of 2001 India census, Birur had a population of 22,601.

Birur is a place famous for its Arecanut/Supari plantations and Coconut.
 The Town Municipal Council was started in 01/09/1912
 The TMC has 23 wards and equal number of Councilors

Birur is surrounded by Tarikere Taluk to the west, Chikkamagaluru Taluk to the west and south, Ajjampura Taluk to the north, Arsikere Taluk to the East.
Birur is 214 km from Bangalore, 198 km from Mysore,  and 7 km from Kadur (Taluk Hq). An inscription dated 1063 A.D. mentions the place as ‘Beeravuru’. 
Birur is a railway junction from where trains run in three directions.

There are temples dedicated to Veerabadhra swamy, Antaraghattamma, Mailaralinga and Biredevaru. The Biredevaru jatra takes place once in 12 years for 15 days.

Colleges near Birur 
Government Pre-University College, B.H Road, Kadur-577548
Government First Grade College, B.H Road, Kadur-577548
Government Pre-University College, Main Road, Kuvempu Nagar, Chowlahiriyur-577180
SK Pre-University College, Singatagere, Banavara Road
Sri Maruthi Pre-University College, Nidaghatta Post, Kadur Taluk, Chikkamagaluru-57754

Nearby places
Kemmangundi: 35 km from Birur town is Kemmangundi, a scenic hill station on the Baba Budan range of hills.
Kallathigiri Falls:  10 km away from Kemmangundi is Kallathigiri falls, also known as Kallatthi Falls. Water cascades 122 metres down from the top of the Chandra Drona Hill.
Amruthapura : 37 km north of Birur, Amruthapura is known for the Amruteshwara temple built in 1196 A.D by Amruteshwara Dandanayaka, a general of the Hoysala ruler Ballala II.
Hebbe Falls: This waterfall is 10 km from Kemmangundi. Water streams down 168 metres in two stages to form Dodda Hebbe (Big Falls) and Chikka Hebbe (Small Falls.).

References

Cities and towns in Chikkamagaluru district